Dondona is a town and commune in Madagascar. It belongs to the district of Soavinandriana, which is a part of Itasy Region. The population of the commune was estimated to be approximately 8,788  in 2018.

It is situated at a distance of 75 km West from the capital Antananarivo and 10km from Soavinandriana.

Only primary schooling is available. The majority 99% of the population of the commune are farmers.  The most important crop is rice, while other important products are maize, cassava and tobacco. Services provide employment for 1% of the population.

Tobacco is an important factor of the local community. Dondona produces mainly Paraky gasy, a kind of chewing tobacco.

References and notes 

Tobacco in Madagascar
Populated places in Itasy Region